Willem "Wim" Jan Frederik Vriend (born 9 November 1941) was a former water polo player from the Netherlands, who finished in eighth position with the Dutch Men's Team at the 1964 Summer Olympics in Tokyo, Japan. His elder brother Harry was also a member of that team.

References

1941 births
Living people
Dutch male water polo players
Olympic water polo players of the Netherlands
Water polo players at the 1964 Summer Olympics
Water polo players from Amsterdam
20th-century Dutch people